Jawahar Navodaya Vidyalaya, Diu or commonly called as JNV Diu, is a boarding, co-educational  school in Diu district, U.T. of Daman and Diu  in India. JNV Diu is funded by M.H.R.D. and administered  by Navodaya Vidyalaya Smiti, an autonomous body under the ministry. Navodaya Vidyalayas offer free education to gifted children, from Class VI to XII.

History 
This school was established in 1987, and is a part of Jawahar Navodaya Vidyalaya schools. JNV Diu shifted to its permanent campus at Bucharwada in 1991. This school is administered and monitored by Pune regional office of Navodaya Vidyalaya Smiti.

Admission 
Admission to JNV Diu at class VI level is made through nationwide selection test conducted by Navodaya Vidyalaya Smiti. The information about test is disseminated and advertised in Diu district by the office of Diu district magistrate (Collector), who is also the chairperson of Vidyalya Management Committee (VMC).

Affiliations 
JNV Diu is affiliated to Central Board of Secondary Education with affiliation number 3140001 .

See also 

 List of JNV schools
 Jawahar Navodaya Vidyalaya, Daman

References

External links 

 Official Website of JNV Diu

Diu
Educational institutions established in 1987
1987 establishments in Daman and Diu
Diu district
Schools in Dadra and Nagar Haveli and Daman and Diu